The 2016 Manila Challenger was a professional tennis tournament played on hard courts. It was the first edition of the tournament which was part of the 2016 ATP Challenger Tour. It took place in Manila, Philippines between 18 and 24 January 2016.

Singles main-draw entrants

Seeds

 1 Rankings are as of January 11, 2016.

Other entrants
The following players received wildcards into the singles main draw:
  Francis Casey Alcantara 
  Ruben Gonzales
  Alberto Lim Jr.
  Jeson Patrombon

The following player received entry to the main draw as a protected ranking:
  Marco Chiudinelli

The following players received entry to the main draw as special exempts:
  Jason Jung 
  Frederico Ferreira Silva

The following players received entry from the qualifying draw:
  Nikola Mektić 
  Frederik Nielsen
  Vijay Sundar Prashanth
  Jimmy Wang

Champions

Singles

 Mikhail Youzhny def.  Marco Chiudinelli 6–4, 6–4

Doubles

 Johan Brunström /  Frederik Nielsen def.  Francis Casey Alcantara /  Christopher Rungkat 6–2, 6–2

References

2016 ATP Challenger Tour
2016 in Philippine sport
January 2016 sports events in the Philippines